The Onion Creek Bridge was built in 1911 near Coffeyville, Kansas. It is unusual in possessing vertical end posts, one of only two such bridges in Kansas. The bridge retains its design integrity.

The Onion Creek Bridge was placed on the National Register of Historic Places in 1990.

See also
List of bridges documented by the Historic American Engineering Record in Kansas

References

External links

Road bridges on the National Register of Historic Places in Kansas
Bridges completed in 1911
Buildings and structures in Montgomery County, Kansas
Historic American Engineering Record in Kansas
1911 establishments in Kansas
National Register of Historic Places in Montgomery County, Kansas
Steel bridges in the United States
Parker truss bridges in the United States